Heterocampa varia, the sandplain heterocampa, is a species of moth in the family Notodontidae (the prominents). Other common names include the alpine mouse-ear and white-marked heterocampa. It was first described by Francis Walker in 1855 and it is found in North America.

The MONA or Hodges number for Heterocampa varia is 7982.

References

Further reading

 
 
 

Notodontidae
Articles created by Qbugbot
Moths described in 1855